Nicktoonsters was a short-lived British and Irish television channel which launched on 18 August 2008 on Sky. It was a spinoff channel of Nicktoons.

Programming 
The Adventures of Jimmy Neutron: Boy Genius
All Grown Up!
As Told By Ginger
CatDog
Doug
The Fairly OddParents
Hey Arnold!
Rugrats
SpongeBob SquarePants
The Wild Thornberrys

History 
Nicktoonsters' license first appeared on the OFCOM website in September 2007. The network was targeted to 5-11 year old children and aired mainly older library content from Nicktoons, broadcasting twelve hours per day from 7am to 7pm daily, with Comedy Central Extra +1 taking the other twelve hours in a channel-sharing arrangement upon the launch of Nicktoonsters.

Nicktoonsters launched with a Rugrats marathon week before it commenced its regular schedule in August 2008, at first exclusively formed of "classic" shows. In later months, newer programmes such as The Fairly OddParents and SpongeBob SquarePants aired on holidays and weekends.

Closure
Nicktoonsters ended its run on 31 July 2009 at 7pm, nearly a year after its launch. Nicktoons +1, known as Nicktoons Replay, replaced it in August 2009.
Comedy Central Extra +1 (Formerly Paramount Comedy 2 +1) eventually reclaimed the full 24 hours of channel space in October 2012 when Nicktoons Replay was discontinued and replaced by Nick Jr. +1.

See also
 Nickelodeon (UK and Ireland)
 Nicktoons (UK and Ireland)
 Nick Jr. (UK and Ireland)

References

External links
 NickToonsters microsite from nick.co.uk
 Nickelodeon to open new UK toon channel from Digital Spy
 Nick UK unveils new toon net from C21media.net

Nicktoons (TV network)
Television channels and stations established in 2008
Defunct television channels in the United Kingdom
Television channels and stations disestablished in 2009
Children's television channels in the United Kingdom